Live und direkt is a double album by German hip hop group Die Fantastischen Vier, consisting of a live part and a studio part. The live part was recorded at three concerts during the Lauschgift-tour with their then backing band disJam, at Huxleys Neue Welt in Berlin on 19 February 1996; at the Turbinenhalle in Oberhausen on 22 February 1996 and during the Bear Music Days in Die Fantastischen Vier's hometown Stuttgart, the Theaterhaus Wangen on 1 June 1996.

The studio part features both previously unreleased tracks and remixes by Waxdoctor, Kenny 'Dope' Gonzales, Die Krupps, Aphex Twin and Guru of Gang Starr.

As a gimmick, the "direkt" CD contains a data part featuring a screensaver, an interactive press kit and three video clips of the group.

Track listing

Live
"Intro" - 1:23
"Locker bleiben" - 4:04
"Ganz normal" - 4:08
"Hip Hop Musik" - 5:54
"Auf der Flucht" - 4:37
"Die Geschichte des O." - 4:21
"Ich bin" - 4:07
"Tag am Meer" - 6:36
"Konsum" - 4:24 min
"Sie ist weg" - 4:01
"Mach dich frei" - 3:11
"Ich krieg nie genug" - 5:26
"Was geht" - 4:21
"Love sucks" - 4:46
"Krieger" - 9:04
"Populär" - 4:51

Direkt
"Raus" (previously unreleased) - 4:02
"Der Picknicker" (previously unreleased) - 3:50
"Das Kind vor dem euch alle warnten" (previously unreleased) - 5:13
"Was geht - Kenny Dope Mix" - 4:58
"Sie ist weg - Guru Remix"- 3:51
"Tag am Meer - Waxdoctor Remix" - 7:10
"Krieger - Aphex Twin Baldhu Mix" - 3:22
"Genug ist genug - Die Krupps Remix" - 4:37

Singles

References

External links
 Official website (in German)
 discography at Discogs

Die Fantastischen Vier albums
1996 live albums
German-language albums